Gian Singh (16 January 1928 – 12 November 2004) was a Malaysian field hockey player. He competed in the men's tournament at the 1956 Summer Olympics.

References

External links
 

1928 births
2004 deaths
Malaysian male field hockey players
Olympic field hockey players of Malaya
Field hockey players at the 1956 Summer Olympics
People from Perak
Sportspeople from Kuala Lumpur
Malaysian sportspeople of Indian descent
Malaysian people of Punjabi descent